Sehome Hill Arboretum is a park on Sehome Hill in Bellingham, Washington.

Sehome may also refer to:

Sehome (neighborhood), a neighborhood near the park
Sehome High School, a high school in Bellingham